"Where Do We Go from Here" is a song by Canadian singer Deborah Cox. It was written by Larry "Rock" Campbell and Lascelles Stephens for her self-titled debut studio album (1995), while production was helmed by Vincent Herbert. Released as the album's third single along with a cover version of The S.O.S. Band's 1983 song "Just Be Good to Me", it became a moderate commercial success. "Where Do We Go from Here" entered the top forty of Canadian Singles Chart and peaked at number 20 in New Zealand, also reaching number 28 on the US Hot R&B/Hip-Hop Songs.

Critical reception
Peter Miro from Cash Box wrote, "Ms. Cox submits a cleanly mastered, radio-friendly ballad, with old school, gospel-tinged flavor. The buildup to this tune is reminiscent of the classic crescendos in “Remember What I Told You To Forget” by Tavares, but straddles a pop/soul borderline."

Track listings

Charts

References

1996 singles
1995 songs
Deborah Cox songs
Arista Records singles
Contemporary R&B ballads
1990s ballads